Steven Joseph "Steve" Loza (born August 9, 1952) is professor of ethnomusicology at UCLA and Lecturer III in music at the University of New Mexico.  He is an author of two books and editor of four anthologies in Latin music, including the first in-depth biography of Tito Puente.

Steven Loza has B.A. in music from California State Polytechnic University, Pomona, a Ph.D. in ethnomusicology (1985), and a master's degree in Latin American studies (1979), both from UCLA.

Taking a two-year leave of absence from the UCLA, he headed the Arts of Americas Institute in the University of New Mexico College of Fine Arts.

He has served on the national screening committee of the Grammy Awards for many years.

Publications

(Spanish language) (2000) Recordando a Tito Puente: el rey del timbal, Random House Espanol

References

Living people
Ethnomusicologists
American musicologists
University of New Mexico faculty
UCLA Herb Alpert School of Music faculty
University of California, Los Angeles alumni
Latin American music
California State Polytechnic University, Pomona alumni
1952 births